Huéneja is a municipality located in the province of Granada, Spain. According to the 2004 census, (INE), the city has a population of 1,222 inhabitants.

References

Municipalities in the Province of Granada